Christine Giampaoli Zonca (born 22 July 1993), more commonly known by her nickname Christine GZ, is an Italian-Spanish rally and off-road race driver.  After an off-road racing career in America, competing with the team Dynamic Racing, Zonca raced in Europe with the Avatel Telecom Race Team. In late 2020, Zonca scored a third-place win in the Andalucia Rally round of the FIA World Cross Country Championship. 

She will be competing in the 2023 season of the all-electric off-road racing championship Extreme E for Carl Cox Motorsport with Timo Scheider as her teammate. She has previously competed for Veloce Racing and Xite Energy Racing in Extreme E.

Biography 
Zonca was born to Italian parents in Pondicherry, India, where she lived for eight years before moving to Milan, Italy, and then to the Tenerife, Canary Islands. She completed a degree in motorsports technology at Birmingham City University.

She initially worked at her neighbor's garage. The first chassis she bought was a 1988 Golf MKII, followed by a 1989 Rally Corolla that she named "Lolla".

In 2014, Zonca won her first title, the overall Championship of the Canaries. In 2016, she was a member of an all-female rally team competing in the Rally Catalunya.

Zonca is a Can-Am Ambassador.

In 2020, Zonca re-launched her racing career after a long COVID lockdown. Together with the Avatel Telecom and co-driver Edu Blanco she competed in the Andalucía Rally. Zonca completed the rally with a 3rd place. She has since continued to work with the Avatel Telecom Racing Team.

On 15 December 2020 she was announced to have signed with formerly known as Hispano Suiza Xite Energy Team to compete in the new all-electric off-road racing championship Extreme E along with Oliver Bennett. She made her debut at the 2021 Desert X-Prix in Al-'Ula, Saudi Arabia, where she finished 5th. The team was re-branded Xite Energy Racing ahead of round 2. At the end of the 2021 season GZ and Bennett classified 9th. She also became a TV presenter for Italian broadcaster Sport MediaSet, covering the FIA Formula E World Championship and driving the BMW i8 Safety Car on the Circuit de Monaco. In addition, she also took part in the Eco Rallye Mallorca, driving the Porsche Taycan.

Racing record

Complete Extreme E results
(key)

* Season still in progress.

References

External links 

 Christine Giampaoli Zonca Website
 

1993 births
Alumni of Birmingham City University
Female rally drivers
Italian female racing drivers
Italian rally drivers
Living people
Off-road racing drivers
Extreme E drivers